The 2013 New Zealand census was the thirty-third national census. "The National Census Day" used for the census was on Tuesday, 5 March 2013. The population of New Zealand was counted as 4,242,048, – an increase of 214,101 or 5.3% over the 2006 census.
 
The 2013 census forms were the same as the forms developed for the 2011 census which was cancelled due to the February 2011 major earthquake in Christchurch. There were no new topics or questions. New Zealand's next census was conducted in March 2018.

Collection methods
The results from the post-enumeration survey showed that the 2013 census recorded 97.6 percent of the  residents in New Zealand on census night. However, the overall response rate was 92.9 percent, with a non-response rate of 7.1 percent made up of the net undercount and people who were counted in the census but had not received a form.

Results

Population and dwellings
Population counts for New Zealand regions.
 Note: All figures are for the census usually resident population count.

Ethnicity
The census usually resident population count of 4,242,048 included 230,649 people without an ethnic response and 4,011,399 people who identified with at least one ethnicity.
The figures for the total ethnicity of the population.

Ethnic groups by region

Birthplace
The number of people living in New Zealand who were born overseas continued to climb. In 2013, 1,001,787 people (25.2 percent) were born overseas.
For the overseas-born census "usually resident population":

Religion

The table below is based on religious affiliation data recorded at the last three censuses for usually resident people. Note that figures and percentages may not add to 100 percent as it is possible for people to state more than one religion.

See also
 2013 in New Zealand
 2018 New Zealand census
 New Zealand census

Notes

References

Censuses in New Zealand
Census
New Zealand